Antoni Stolpe (23 May 1851 – 7 September 1872) was a Polish composer and pianist.

He was born in Puławy as a descendant of a musical family. His first teacher of music was his father, Edward, a pianist under whom Antoni Stolpe developed piano skills also at the Warsaw Conservatory where he simultaneously studied harmony and counterpoint with August Freyer and later with Stanisław Moniuszko. This time marks his first efforts in the field of composition, e.g. he wrote the vocal piece O Salutaris Hostia in 1866.

In 1867 the sixteen-year-old Antoni Stolpe completed his education at the Conservatory with a “grand prize” in piano and a first prize in counterpoint and in 1868–69 he gave three concerts in Warsaw performing as a pianist and conductor. During these concerts, several of his orchestral works, chamber, piano and vocal compositions were presented. For those performances Antoni Stolpe received splendid reviews from critics as both a gifted composer and pianist.

An income from the mentioned concerts enabled him to travel in 1869 to Berlin where he studied composition and counterpoint with Friedrich Kiel and perfected his playing technique with the famous piano professor Theodor Kullak at the Neue Akademie der Tonkunst. Upon seeing his exceptional abilities, Kullak offered him the position of a piano professor at the Academy. His visit to Berlin was cut short by illness, pneumonia. The family took him back to Warsaw, but unfortunately the tuberculosis that attacked the frail body of the composer was incurable at the time. Despite the family’s efforts, visits to the spa resorts of Szczawno-Zdrój and Merano, Antoni Stolpe was not cured. He died aged 21 in Merano.

Antoni Stolpe composed around 60 works, including among others: Symphony in A minor  (1867), concert overtures, Grand March “Hommage a Mendelssohn” for orchestra (1868), Polonaise in A flat major for piano and string quintet (1866), Dramatic Scene for cello and string quintet (1867), Piano Sextet in E minor (1867), Piano Trio (1869), Variations for string quartet, Sonata for violin and piano (1872), piano sonatas: in A minor – unfinished (1867) and in D minor (1870), Allegro appassionato in C minor (1869) and Variations in D minor (1870) for piano, piano etudes, Credo for mixed choir, string quintet and organ (1867), Song to the words by Victor Hugo for tenor and orchestra (1868), Ave Maria for contralto and string quintet (1869) and many others.

In his compositions, Antoni Stolpe combined Polish musical tradition with the treasure trove of the European Romantic music. Antoni Stolpe’s works are an eloquent testimony to his great talent and capabilities. They let us presume that if not for his premature death he would have become an eminent figure contributing prolifically to the development of Polish and European music alike.

From among Stolpe’s compositions only the Piano Sonata in D minor and more recently also some of the chamber music (the Piano Sextet in E minor, Dramatic Scene for cello and string quintet and Variations in G major for string quartet) were brought out in print. The other works (from which many were lost) remain in manuscript and are currently held at the Biblioteka Jagiellońska in Kraków and the Biblioteka PWM in Warsaw.

Recordings
 Camerata Vistula, Jerzy Maciejewski, Anna Wróbel: Opera omnia 1; chamber music; Pro Musica Camerata PMC 039
 Stefan Łabanowski: Piano works; Acte Préalable AP0203
 Mirosław Gąsieniec: Opera omnia 2/3 – Piano works; Pro Musica Camerata PMC 060/061
 Klavierquintett-Wien: Józef Nowakowski, Zygmunt Noskowski, Antoni Stolpe; chamber music; Camerata Tokyo

References
 ANTONI STOLPE (1851-1872) - A FORGOTTEN COMPOSER
 Encyklopedia Muzyczna PWM, Kraków 2007.
 Stanisław Golachowski, “Antoni Stolpe - szkic biograficzny”, Muzyka Polska, 1935, No. 7, pp. 169–85.

1851 births
1872 deaths
19th-century classical composers
Composers for piano
19th-century deaths from tuberculosis
Polish classical pianists
Male classical pianists
Polish composers
People from Puławy County
Polish Romantic composers
Polish male classical composers
19th-century classical pianists
19th-century male musicians
Tuberculosis deaths in Italy
Infectious disease deaths in Trentino-Alto Adige/Südtirol